Beethoven Virus is a 2008 South Korean television series starring Kim Myung-min, Lee Ji-ah, and Jang Keun-suk. The show drew attention for being the first Korean drama to depict the lives of classical musicians, an orchestra and ordinary people who dream of becoming musicians. It aired on MBC from September 10 to November 12, 2008 on Wednesdays and Thursdays at 21:55 for 18 episodes.

Synopsis
Kang Gun-woo (or Kang Mae) is a world-renowned orchestra maestro who is a perfectionist in his work. He is not an easy person to work with and is feared by all his players. By chance, he comes across a woman named Du Ru-mi who plays the violin, and a young cop also named Kang Gun-woo who is a musical genius, even without formal training. The three soon get tangled in a love triangle as Kang Mae attempts to salvage a local orchestra.

The unlikely orchestra 
Du Ru-mi works as a public civil officer, but she never loses her dream of playing in the orchestra one day. Her chance finally arrived when she submitted, and got approved, on the idea of making Seokran a music city, and with that she has the budget to hire an orchestra.

However, her elation was short lived, as she was scammed for 300 million won (300 thousand US dollars in 2008) by the promoter, and the professional members refuse to play without being paid. As the last resort, she assembled a group of players whom are willing to perform for free, among them include:
 Jung Hee-yeon, a housewife playing cello
 Bae Yong-gi, a cabaret playing trumpet
 Kim Gab-yong, an oboist whom currently is struggling with Alzheimer's disease
 Ha Yi-deun, a high school student playing flute
 Kang Gun-woo, a traffic police officer whom plays trumpet
 and Du Ru-mi herself, playing violin.

With a huge effort from Du Ru-mi, the orchestra was finally formed. However, awaiting them is the world class conductor Kang Gun-woo, whom demands the best performance from the very best players. It is his first time returning to Korea after 10 years, after his spectacular refusal to conduct a performance, in front of the president and the general public, due to his orchestra was not good enough.

It didn't take Maestro Kang long to discover the dismal standards of the members, and he demands to immediately return back to Vienna after the first rehearsal. However, as Du Ru-mi and Kang Gun-woo help rescuing Maestro Kang's dog from an overdose, Maestro Kang agrees on conducting the local orchestra. Though the tension is high and multiple times Maestro Kang was deciding to quit, he stayed till the end and led the local orchestra to do a nearly impossible performance. With that, Maestro Kang is offered a director position for the newly created Seokran Orchestra, a lifetime position that he has been dreaming for many years. He decides to accept the position, but fires all the local orchestra members, much to their collective dismay.

The Ninth Symphony 
The local members are outraged, but have to concede as Maestro Kang is hiring people for the orchestra, and this time with the true professionals whom standard are unquestionably higher. But they don't give up. They stand in as the temporary members, and privately in secret they practice the Beethoven Ninth's Symphony, hoping they will be selected when Maestro Kang selects this symphony to be performed. And their chance finally comes when Maestro Kang bows to public demand.

Cast

Main characters
Kim Myung-min as Kang Gun-woo/Kang Mae (Conductor)
Kang Gun-woo is an orchestra conductor who is a single forty-year-old man that lives with a dog named Toven (named after Beethoven). He is very talented and famous for his excellent skills in music. Conductor Kang feels that classical music is for the nobility and to play the noble classics, the talent of players should be brilliant. Because he believes in this, he insults many musicians who do not match his perfection. However, he has shown jealousy and hatred in the past for those who are naturally talented, or those who are prodigies in music, such as Maestro Jung. He also has shown that he hated the trumpet player Kang Gun-woo for being a genius in the beginning of the drama.

Kang Mae is notorious for his aggressiveness and sharp tongue. His nickname is "orchestra killer." His personality is mostly written in his face when he encounters trouble and he smirks to show he isn't weak. The reason that he has spent most of his time overseas is because he had once refused to perform in front of a large audience, which included the president.

Lee Ji-ah as Du Ru-mi (Violin)
Du Ru-mi is the concert mistress of the project orchestra. Despite her delicate appearance, she is actually hot-tempered, moody, and optimistic about everything. Her headaches and tinnitus are the symptoms of a tumor that is impinging on her cochlear nerve, an acoustic neuroma, perhaps, which will eventually cause complete hearing loss. Now, she has a resolute goal to continue to play the violin and continue to perform on stage until she loses her hearing completely.

Jang Keun-suk as Kang Gun-woo (Trumpet)
Kang Gun-woo is a traffic officer with a strong sense of justice. To help a pregnant woman get to the hospital, he moves a car by crashing it into another car, which causes him to be suspended from his position. Even though he cannot read music, he has a natural talent for playing the trumpet and for music itself. The project orchestra that he joins through Ru-mi's recommendation gives him an opportunity to open his eyes and ears to music and conducting.

Supporting characters
Lee Soon-jae as Kim Gab-yong (Oboe)
Hyun Jyu-ni as Ha Yi-deun (Flute)
Song Ok-sook as Jung Hee-yeon (Cello)
Park Chul-min as Bae Yong-gi (Trumpet)
Jung Suk-yong as Park Hyuk-kwon (Double Bass)
Lee Bong-gyu as Park Jin-man
Kim Young-min as Jung Myung-hwan
Jo Se-eun as Kim Joo-yeon
Park Eun-joo as Kim Joo-hee
Lee Han-wi as Kang Chun-bae
Park Kil-soo as Kim Kye-jang
Hwang Young-hee as Hyuk-kwon's wife
Baek Jae-jin as refugees' leader (ep 10)
Kim Ik as doctor (ep 10)
 Ryu Ui-hyun

Production
At the drama's press conference prior to airing, Kim Myung-min, who plays the talented yet difficult maestro Kang, actually conducted Ennio Morricone's Gabriel's Oboe, and Johannes Brahms' Hungarian Dances with a full orchestra in front of reporters and fans who came to the venue. Kang is based on real-life conductor Shin-ik Hahm.

Several famous musicians made cameo appearances in the drama, including pianist Dong-Hyek Lim and violist Richard Yongjae O'Neill.

Awards and nominations

International broadcast
The series aired in the Philippines on Q Channel 11 (now GTV) beginning April 12, 2010, on Mondays to Fridays at 2:00 p.m. It aired in Japan on Fuji TV beginning February 1, 2011, on Mondays to Fridays, at 2:07-3:57 p.m.

It aired in Thailand on Channel 3 beginning July 21, 2012, on Saturdays and Sundays at 1:30-4:00 a.m.

References

External links
Beethoven Virus official MBC website 

Classical music television series
MBC TV television dramas
Korean-language television shows
2008 South Korean television series debuts
2008 South Korean television series endings
South Korean romance television series
South Korean musical television series
Television series by Kim Jong-hak Production